Mohamed Babiker Yagoub (born 2 September 1977) is a Sudanese middle-distance runner. He competed in the men's 800 metres at the 1996 Summer Olympics. Yagoub, who is an ethnic Fur and native of Darfur, has a nephew named Waleed Suliman currently running for the University of Mississippi.

References

1977 births
Living people
People from Darfur
Athletes (track and field) at the 1996 Summer Olympics
Athletes (track and field) at the 2000 Summer Olympics
Sudanese male middle-distance runners
Olympic athletes of Sudan
Place of birth missing (living people)